Morning Symphony Ideas is a posthumous compilation album by Jimi Hendrix, released on July 25, 2000 by Dagger Records. The album contains previously unreleased studio and home demo recordings. "Keep on Grooving" was later featured on the companion CD to the 2007 book Jimi Hendrix: An Illustrated Experience.

Track listing
All songs were written by Jimi Hendrix.

Personnel
Jimi Hendrix – guitar, vocals on tracks 3 and 5
Buddy Miles – drums on tracks 1-4
Billy Cox – bass on track 4

Compilation albums published posthumously
Jimi Hendrix compilation albums
2000 compilation albums
Dagger Records compilation albums